Austria have appeared in three UEFA European Championships: Euro 2008, Euro 2016, and Euro 2020.

As a host nation, they qualified automatically for UEFA Euro 2008, marking their debut in the tournament. After losing their opening game and drawing the second, the co-hosts still had a theoretical chance to advance to the second round, but were eliminated after a 0–1 loss to Germany.

For Euro 2016, Austria qualified as winners of their qualifying group, before once again exiting in the group stage after only picking up one point. They qualified for Euro 2020 by finishing second in their group, and reached the knockout phase at the tournament for the first time, before being eliminated by Italy in the round of 16 after extra time.

Overall record

Euro 2008

Group stage

Euro 2016

Group stage

Euro 2020

Group stage

Knockout phase

Round of 16

References

 
Countries at the UEFA European Championship